The 1898 Nebraska Bugeaters football team represented the University of Nebraska in the 1898 college football season. The team was coached by first-year head coach Fielding H. Yost and played their home games at Antelope Field in Lincoln, Nebraska. After six seasons in the Western Interstate University Football Association, Nebraska began competing as an independent in 1898.

After the departure of Eddie N. Robinson following the 1897 season, Nebraska hired another future College Football Hall of Fame coach in Yost. Yost stayed at NU for just one year before moving on to Kansas, Stanford, and Michigan, where he won six national championships.

Nebraska played 11 games in 1898, the most in the program's nine-year history, including three instances with only one day off in between games.

Schedule

Coaching staff

Roster

Starters

Game summaries

Hastings

Nebraska hosted nearby Hastings College to open the season. The Bugeaters dominated the undermatched Broncos, setting new program records for points scored and margin of victory in a 76–0 shutout win.

Iowa State

Nebraska jumped out to a halftime lead and held on in the second half to extend its winning streak to seven games.

Tarkio

Nebraska jumped out to a quick 12–0 lead and shut down Tarkio's offense to win 24–0.

William Jewell

Nebraska overpowered William Jewell in Kansas City en route to a 38–0 shutout victory, NU's seventh shutout in its previous nine games. This was the only game ever played between Nebraska and William Jewell.

at Missouri

Just two days after defeating William Jewell, Nebraska faced Missouri in Columbia. The Tigers jumped out to a 6–0 lead, but Nebraska answered with 47 unanswered points to earn a dominant win over Missouri for the second consecutive season.

Grinnell

Grinnell forced the game's cancellation, claiming Nebraska did not follow requirements in selecting game officials.

at Kansas

Kansas lost a key (though unnamed) player to injury early in the game, and was unable to keep up with Nebraska. This was Nebraska's 11th consecutive victory.

at Kansas City Medics

Nebraska faced the  just two days after defeating Kansas. The Medics ended Nebraska's winning streak with a resounding 24–0 victory.

Drake

Several key Nebraska players reportedly sat out with injuries following a dense stretch of games in the weeks prior. Drake took advantage of the undermanned Bugeaters, winning 6–5 in the first-ever meeting of these teams.

Colorado

Nebraska made its first trip to Boulder in 1898, the first game in what would later become an annual rivalry. The Silver and Gold, as Colorado was known at the time, could not keep pace with the Bugeaters in the second half.

at Denver AC

A newspaper account of the time stated this game was "the most even and hardy contested fight that has been waged on the Denver gridiron". Nebraska again played with only one day off since its previous game. The Bugeaters took advantage of Denver kicking woes, staving off a late Denver drive into NU territory to win by a single point. This was the final meeting between Denver AC and Nebraska.

at Iowa

Nebraska jumped out front with an early touchdown, and led 5–0 at halftime. A late Iowa touchdown and successful point after gave the Hawkeyes a 6–5 lead, at which point the game was called on account of darkness; frequent disputes had lengthened the game and prevented its completion.

References

Nebraska
Nebraska Cornhuskers football seasons
Nebraska Bugeaters football